Azov Upland is a plateau or range of hills in East Ukraine within the Donetsk and Zaporizhia oblasts.

To the north it borders Dnieper Lowland, to northeast – Donets Ridge, southwest – Black Sea Lowland, south – Azov Lowland.

The climate is similar to Donets Ridge. Soils are categorized as chernozem of poor or medium humus. Vegetation is a fescue-feather-grass steppe.

References

External links
 Azov Upland at the Encyclopedia of Ukraine
 Azov Upland at the Encyclopædia Britannica
 Azov Upland at the Great Soviet Encyclopedia

Plateaus of Ukraine
East European Plain